The Acrobatic Gymnastics European Championships are the main acrobatic gymnastics championships in Europe. The championships are organized by European Gymnastics, formerly known as the European Union of Gymnastics (French: Union Européenne de Gymnastique or UEG).

Timeline 
 Creation of the International Federation of Sports Acrobatics (IFSA) = 1973
 Olympic recognition by the International Olympic Committee (IOC) = 1985
 Creation of the European Sports Acrobatics Federation (EUROSAF) = 1993
 Merger IFSA with Fédération Internationale de Gymnastique (FIG) = 1999

Championships 
Seniors in 1980, 1982, 1984, 1986, 1988, 1990, 1992, 1995 and 1996 was held alongside Acrobatic Gymnastics World Championships, also 1989 alongside 7th Acrobatic Gymnastics World Cup.

Seniors

Teams (Juniors and Seniors)

Juniors

Age Groups

See also 
 Acrobatic Gymnastics World Championships

References

External links 
 * 
 European Gymnastics (official website)
 International Federation of Gymnastics (official website)
 http://www.sportsacrobatics.info/en/samerger.shtml

 
Recurring sporting events established in 1978